Bulut Basmaz (born 6 May 1984) is a Turkish former professional footballer. Basmaz is also a youth international, earning caps from the U-19, U-20, U-21, and Turkey Olympic team.

References

1984 births
Footballers from İzmir
Living people
Turkish footballers
Turkey youth international footballers
Association football goalkeepers
Altay S.K. footballers
Denizlispor footballers
Kocaelispor footballers
Elazığspor footballers
Manisaspor footballers
Bucaspor footballers
Kırklarelispor footballers
Aydınspor footballers
Süper Lig players
TFF First League players
TFF Second League players
Mediterranean Games silver medalists for Turkey
Mediterranean Games medalists in football
Competitors at the 2005 Mediterranean Games